The 1984–85 Challenge Cup was the 84th staging of rugby league's oldest knockout competition, the Challenge Cup. The 1984–85 Rugby Football League season's tournament was known as the Silk Cut Challenge Cup for sponsorship reasons. It culminated in a final contested by Wigan and Hull F.C. at Wembley, London before a crowd of 99,801. Wigan won the match 28–24 with their Australian stand-off half, Brett Kenny winning the Lance Todd Trophy as man of the match.

Preliminary round

First round

Second round

Third round

Semi final

Replay

Final
This was the first meeting of Wigan and Hull F.C. in the Challenge Cup Final since 1959 when Wigan won 30–13. The attendance of 99,801 was the highest ever recorded for the Cup Final at Wembley Stadium.

References

External links
Challenge Cup official website 
Challenge Cup 1984/85 results at Rugby League Project

Challenge Cup
Challenge Cup
1985 in Welsh rugby league